Pina Records is a Puerto Rican record label founded by Rafael Antonio Pina Nieves in 1996. It is the most famous and successful record label in the reggaeton music industry due to its long background history and artists. Currently, Pina Records manages Daddy Yankee, R.K.M & Ken-Y, Natti Natasha and Plan B.

Roster
 R.K.M & Ken-Y

Producers and composers
 DJ Eliel
 Myztiko
 Lobo

Affiliated artists and producers
 Haze
 Duran
 Mambo Kingz
 Tainy 
 DJ Blass
 Luny Tunes
 DJ Luian
 Wise
 Natti Natasha

Artists previously signed to the label
 Don Chezina (1996-2005)
 Lito & Polaco (1999-2007)
 Daddy Yankee (2001)
 Master Joe & O.G. Black (2000-2003)
 MC Ceja  (2001-2003)
 Nicky Jam (2001-2008)
 Karel & Voltio (2001-2003)
 Maicol & Manuel (2002-2004)
 Hector & Tito (2002) One album deal for The Godfather
 Yaviah (2002 - 2009)
 Sir Speedy (2003 - 2005)
 Carlitos Way (2006-2009)
 Cruzito (2006-2010)
 Grupo Karis (2007)
 Ashanti Baeza (2008-2009)
 Zion & Lennox (2010-2013)
 Plan B (duo) (2008-2020)
 Maldy (Plan B) (2008-2017)
 Chencho Corleone (Plan B) (2008-2020)
 Jalil Lopez (2011-2013)
 El Sica (2016-2017) (retired from the industry)
 Tony Dize (2013-2015)
 Don Omar
 Yaga y Mackie (2001)
 Jenay (2001-2003) - murdered in 2019
 DJ Blass (2001-2003)
 DJ Dicky (1999-2006)
 DJ Magic (1999-2006)
 Arcángel (2012-2019)

Discography
 Bien Guillao de Gangster (Don Chezina) (1997)
 DJ Joe 6: Escuadron Del Panico (1998)
 Éxitos Vol. 1 (Lito & Polaco) (2000) 
 Masacrando MC's (Lito & Polaco) (2000)
 Francotiradores (Master Joe & O.G. Black) (2000)
 La Conspiración (2001)
 DJ Blass: Sandunguero (2001)
 Haciendo Escante (Nicky Jam) (2001)
 El Cartel II (Daddy Yankee) (2001)
 Mundo Frío (Lito & Polaco) (2002)
 DJ Dicky: No Fear 4 - Sin Miedo (2002)
 Gavilan: Despertando Conciencia Vol. 2 (2002)
 Francotiradores Vol. 2 (Master Joe & O.G. Black) (2002)
 The Godfather (2002)
 Yakaleo (Maicol & Manuel) (2002)
 DJ Blass: Sandunguero Vol. 2 (2003)
 Dando Cocotazos (Sir Speedy) (2003)
 La Colección (Master Joe & O.G. Black album)  (2003)
 La Conspiración Vol. 2: La Secuela (2003)
 Pina All-Star (2003)
 Pina...The Company: Los Mas Duros (2003)
 Mi Trayectoria (Don Chezina) (2004)
 DJ Dicky: No Fear Classics (2004)
 Fuera de Serie (Lito & Polaco) (2004)
 Pina All-Star Vol. 2 (2004)
 Vida Escante (Nicky Jam) (2004) 
 Boricuas NY 2 (2004)
 Reggaeton's Best Features (2004)
 Da' Concert of Reggaeton (2005)
 Fuera de Serie Live (Lito & Polaco) (2005)
 Reggaeton Bachatero Non Stop (2005)
 Reggaeton's Best Features (2005)
 Vida Escante: Special Edition (Nicky Jam) (2005)
 Los Nenes Del Blin Blin (Plan B) (2005) 
 Reggaetion Street Mix (2005)
 Pina All Stars: The Dream Team (2005)
 Masterpiece (RKM & Ken-Y) (2006)
 Masterpiece: World Tour (Sold Out) (RKM & Ken-Y) (2006) 
 Los Famosos del Reggaeton (2006)
 Masterpiece "Commemorative Edition" (RKM & Ken-Y) (2007) 
 The Black Carpet (Nicky Jam) (2007)
 Los 4 Fantasticos (Karis) (2007) 
 Interestatal 69: El Camino Al Placer (Plan B) (2007)
 Reggaeton de Markesina (Maldy Plan B) (2007)
 The Royalty: La Realeza (RKM & Ken-Y) (2008)
 La Melodía De La Calle: Updated (Tony Dize) (2009)
 The Last Chapter (RKM & Ken-Y) (2010)
 The Platinum Chronicles (Cruzito) (2010)
 House of Pleasure (Plan B) (2010)
 Los Verdaderos (Zion & Lennox) (2010)
 Forever (R.K.M & Ken-Y) (2011)
 La Formula (Zion & Lennox, Plan B, RKM & Ken-Y, Arcángel, Lobo & Jalil Lopez) (2012)
 Sentimiento, Elegancia & Maldad (Arcángel) (2013)
 Love & Sex (Plan B) (2014)
 La Melodia De La Calle, 3rd Season (Tony Dize) (2015)
 The Last Don 2 (Don Omar) (2015)
 Los Favoritos (Arcángel & DJ Luian) (2015)
 Ares (Arcángel) (2018)
 IllimuNatti (Natti Natasha) (2019)
 Nattividad (Natti Natasha) (2021)
 Anubis (Fran Rozzano) (2023)

DVDs
 Pina Records: Los Videos
 Los Vídeos del Reggaetón 2 (2003)
 La Conspiración DVD (2004)

See also
Machete Music
List of record labels

References

External links
Official Website

American independent record labels
Puerto Rican record labels
Reggaeton record labels
Record labels established in 2003
Puerto Rican brands